The Langthwaite Filter House is a house in Langthwaite Road, Quernmore, Lancaster, England. There is also a filter house in Scotforth.

Restoration of the filter house was featured on an episode of the Channel 4 series The Restoration Man.

References

Buildings and structures in the City of Lancaster